Shighnan District ( -) is one of the 28 districts of the Badakhshan Province in eastern Afghanistan.  It's part of the history region of Shighnan that is today divided between Afghanistan and Tajikistan.The district borders the Panj River and Tajikistan in the northeast, the Maimay district to the west, the Raghistan district in the southwest, the Kohistan, Arghanj Khwa, and Shuhada districts in the south, and the Ishkashim district in the southeast.
 
Lake Shewa is located in Shighnan Valley.

Demography
The Khowar, Tajiks, Khoshey, and Pamiris are the major ethnic groups. Only farsi and shughnani language is spoken and understood in shughnan.

This District has a population of 27,750

Villages and places it

References

External links
>Shighnan District

Districts of Badakhshan Province